James "Spider" Martin (April 1, 1939 – April 8, 2003) was an American photographer known for his work documenting the American Civil Rights Movement in 1965, specifically Bloody Sunday and other incidents from the Selma to Montgomery marches.

Life
Martin was born in Fairfield, Alabama.

Whilst working as a photographer for The Birmingham News he was assigned to cover the death of Jimmie Lee Jackson in February 1965; one month later, he created a notable photograph of the civil rights era, entitled Two Minute Warning, during the 1965 Selma Voting Rights Movement. His photograph showed Alabama state troopers about to attack the first peaceful Selma to Montgomery march with batons and tear gas just after it had crossed the Edmund Pettus Bridge from Selma into Dallas County on 7 March 1965. Hosea Williams and John Lewis were leading the planned  march to the Alabama State Capitol in protest at unfair treatment of African Americans and discriminatory voting rights practices. The incident, known as Bloody Sunday, the media coverage of it and the national outcry that ensued, were influential in the course of civil rights in the U.S. Speaking about the effect of photography on the Civil Rights Movement, Martin Luther King Jr. said, "Spider, we could have marched, we could have protested forever, but if it weren't for guys like you, it would have been for nothing. The whole world saw your pictures. That's why the Voting Rights Act was passed."

Martin would join the third march, covering it from start to finish, at the Alabama State Capitol building. During the march, Martin took a photograph of an exhausted minister from Maine on the verge of quitting the march. Martin told him "I weigh 125 pounds, my camera bag is 50 pounds, and I [am] walking backwards and shooting pictures" and helped the minister back to his feet. After the Selma to Montgomery marches, Martin covered the trial of the murderer of Viola Liuzzo and George Wallace's 1968 presidential campaign, reportedly telling the candidate "I won't vote for you, but I'll take your money."

His photographs were published in Life, Saturday Evening Post, Time, Der Spiegel, Stern, Paris Match, Birmingham Weekly and The Birmingham News

He was represented for several years by Black Star, from 1965.

The Dolph Briscoe Center for American History at the University of Texas at Austin acquired Martin's archive of negatives, correspondence, memos, clippings, and other material in 2015 for $250,000.

He died by suicide on April 8, 2003 in Blount Springs, Alabama.

Publication

Exhibitions
Rotunda, Cannon House Office Building, Washington, D.C.
Agnes, Birmingham, AL.
The Power of His Camera: Spider Martin and the Civil Rights Movement (Austin, Texas; 8 Apr–19 Dec 2014)
Spider Martin Retrospective:  Exploring the Role of Photojournalism in Influencing History, Carneal Building, Selma, AL, 2015.
Lyndon Baines Johnson Presidential Library and Museum, Austin, TX, 2015.
Selma March 1965, Steven Kasher Gallery, New York, 2015. Photographs by Martin, Charles Moore and James Barker.
"The World Saw Your Pictures": Spider Martin and the Voting Rights Campaign, Alabama Department of Archives and History, Montgomery, AL, 2015.
Selma to Montgomery: Spider Martin’s Historic Photographs, Archaeology Museum, University of South Alabama, Mobile, AL, 2015.
Selma to Montgomery: March for the Right to Vote, Atlanta; and traveled to New Orleans; Montgomery; Washington, D.C.; and Levine Museum of the New South, Charlotte, NC, 2015. Curated by the Birmingham Civil Rights Institute.

Collections
Martin's photographs are held in the following permanent collections:

Birmingham Civil Rights Institute, Birmingham, AL
National Museum of African American History and Culture, Washington, D.C.
Dolph Briscoe Center for American History, Austin, TX

See also
 List of photographers of the civil rights movement

References

External links
 
 Ed Mullins, "Spider Martin", University of Alabama.
 "Civil Rights Photographer Spider Martin: His Life and Legacy", WBHM Public Radio-Voices of the Civil Rights Movement

American photojournalists
Artists who committed suicide
American portrait photographers
Artists from Birmingham, Alabama
1939 births
2003 deaths
Journalists from Alabama
Selma to Montgomery marches
Hueytown High School alumni
2003 suicides
20th-century American journalists
American male journalists